James Temple was a regicide of Charles I.

James Temple may also refer to:

J. R. Temple (James Roland Temple, 1899–1980), mayor of Dallas
James Temple, a character in the film Key Largo

See also

James Temple-Smithson